Klever may refer to:

 Klever, Norway, a village in Norway
 Reinette Klever, Dutch politician
 Valery Klever, Russian painter
 Klever, Russian app and trivia game